St. Hedwig is a town in Bexar County, Texas, United States. The population was 2,227 at the 2020 census. It is part of the San Antonio Metropolitan Statistical Area.

History
The town was founded by John Demmer in 1852 when he moved to the area from his native Silesia. In 1856, four more Silesians immigrated to the area and built the site's first Catholic Church, Annunciation (under the Roman Catholic Archdiocese of San Antonio). In 1860, a post office named Cottage Hill was opened, but was later renamed St. Hedwig after the patron saint of Silesia. By 1868, the community had built a stone church, and in 1897, the town boasted 200 families mainly from Poland and Germany.

Geography

Demographics

As of the 2020 United States census, there were 2,227 people, 790 households, and 573 families residing in the town.

2000 census

As of the census of 2000, there were 1,875 people, 653 households, and 543 families residing in the town. The population density was 62.3 people per square mile (24.1/km2). There were 687 housing units at an average density of 22.8 per square mile (8.8/km2). The racial makeup of the town was 91.95% White, 2.88% African American, 0.32% Native American, 0.21% Asian, 0.05% Pacific Islander, 2.67% from other races, and 1.92% from two or more races. Hispanic or Latino of any race were 10.35% of the population.

There were 653 households, out of which 40.0% had children under the age of 18 living with them, 73.0% were married couples living together, 6.3% had a female householder with no husband present, and 16.7% were non-families. 13.6% of all households were made up of individuals, and 7.5% had someone living alone who was 65 years of age or older. The average household size was 2.87 and the average family size was 3.17.

In the town, the population was spread out, with 27.2% under the age of 18, 6.1% from 18 to 24, 30.2% from 25 to 44, 25.9% from 45 to 64, and 10.5% who were 65 years of age or older. The median age was 38 years. For every 100 females, there were 105.8 males. For every 100 females age 18 and over, there were 101.6 males.

The median income for a household in the town was $55,481, and the median income for a family was $58,603. Males had a median income of $34,615 versus $27,700 for females. The per capita income for the town was $19,477. About 4.1% of families and 6.7% of the population were below the poverty line, including 9.3% of those under age 18 and 11.4% of those age 65 or over.

References

External links
 

Towns in Bexar County, Texas
Towns in Texas
Greater San Antonio
Populated places established in 1852
Silesian-American culture in Texas
Silesian-American history
1852 establishments in Texas